Cavell Creek is a stream in Alberta, Canada.

Cavell Creek has the name of Edith Cavell, an English nurse.

See also
List of rivers of Alberta

References

Rivers of Alberta